Sidney Tyler (7 December 1904 – 25 January 1971) was an English footballer who played as a full-back.

Born in Wolverhampton, Tyler began his career with nearby Stourbridge. As a 17-year-old, he joined Manchester United in May 1922, but he only played one match for them in the 1923–24 season, a 3–0 home win over Leicester City on 10 November 1923. In May 1924, he returned to his hometown club, Wolverhampton Wanderers, who had just been promoted back to the Second Division. However, Tyler struggled to hold down a first team spot at Wolves and only made 18 league appearances in three seasons there.

He signed for Third Division South side Gillingham in August 1927, where he made a far bigger impression. In two seasons with the Kent club, Tyler made 76 league appearances, but he left in 1929, first on trial with Norwich City, before joining Millwall on a permanent basis. After 29 games in two seasons with Millwall, Tyler moved to Colwyn Bay United in 1931, before returning to the West Midlands in 1933 to play for Chamberlain & Hookham.

References

External links
Profile at MUFCInfo.com
Profile at StretfordEnd.co.uk

1904 births
1971 deaths
Footballers from Wolverhampton
English footballers
Association football fullbacks
Stourbridge F.C. players
Manchester United F.C. players
Wolverhampton Wanderers F.C. players
Gillingham F.C. players
Millwall F.C. players
Colwyn Bay F.C. players
English Football League players